The Women's Open National is a team handball tournament to determine the National Champion from the US. Chicago Inter holds the most title in the women's division. The current US reigning champion is New York City THC.

The 2020 US Club Nationals were cancelled due to COVID-19 and, hence, no champion was designated.

Results

Division B

Individual Awards

Medal count

References

 Women's Open